"Corner of the Earth" is the fourth and final single from British funk and acid jazz band Jamiroquai's fifth studio album, A Funk Odyssey (2001). The song was written by Jason Kay and Rob Harris and is a bossa nova–type track, reflecting on the problems that people of the Earth have to suffer. The song peaked at number 31 on the UK Singles Chart and was the last Jamiroquai single to use the DVD format. The video consists of Jay Kay sitting and dancing in a forest, wearing his trademark feather headdress. He does several other things, such as creating balls of light and making the moon come out.

Track listings
UK 12-inch single
 "Corner of the Earth" (Radio Edit) – 3:55
 "Main Vein" (Deep Swing's Jazzy Thumper Mix) – 7:51
 "Main Vein" (Knee Deep Classic Mix) – 6:50
 "Main Vein" (Knee Deep Vocal Dub) – 6:57

Australia CD single
 "Corner of the Earth" (Radio Edit) – 3:55
 "Bad Girls" (Live at The Brits 2002; featuring Anastacia) – 4:13
 "Love Foolosophy" (Mondo Grosso Love Acoustic Mix) – 4:43
 "Titan" (Live at Telewest Arena) – 3:25

Charts

Release history

References

Jamiroquai songs
2001 songs
2002 singles
Bossa nova songs
Columbia Records singles
Songs written by Jason Kay
S2 Records singles